Alfonso Félix de Ávalos Aquino y Gonzaga, 8th Marquis of Pescara, 4th Marquis of Vasto (Ischia 1564 – Rome, 2 December 1593), was an Italian noble in the service of the King of Spain. 

Alfonso Félix was the eldest son of Francesco Ferdinando d'Ávalos, governor of Milan and viceroy of Sicily, and Isabella Gonzaga.

He commanded cavalry for Spain against the Dutch Revolt, where he gained a victory in the Battle of Zutphen in 1586.   
He was a Grandee of Spain and became also a Knight in the Order of the Golden Fleece.

In 1583 he married Lavinia della Rovere (1558–1632), daughter of Guidobaldo II della Rovere, Duke of Urbino and Vittoria Farnese, granddaughter of Pope Paul III. 
They had 3 daughters. 
His eldest daughter, Isabella d’Avalos d’Aquino d’Aragona (1585–1648), married her father's cousin Inigo d’Avalos d’Aquino d’Aragona (1578–1632) and had issue.

Sources

 Gran Enciclopedia de España. Band 3, 1991, S. 1,109 f. 
 Genealogisches Handbuch der fürstlichen Häuser. Band XV, S. 540 f., C. A. Starke Verlag, 1997,

Links  
 Geneall
 Our Royal, Titled, Noble, and Commoner Ancestors & Cousins
 Lavinia Feltria della Rovere e Felice Alfonso d'Avalos, un matrimonio stroncato

1564 births
1593 deaths
Year of birth unknown
Marquesses of Spain
Knights of the Golden Fleece
D'Avalos family
Italian people of the Eighty Years' War
Grandees of Spain
17th-century Italian military personnel